North Carolina Granite Corporation Quarry Complex is a historic granite quarry and national historic district located at Mount Airy, Surry County, North Carolina. The district encompasses 22 contributing buildings, 1 contributing site, and 8 contributing structures in an area approximately one mile long and 1/3 mile wide.  Notable contributing resources include the cutting shed (1927), the office building (1928), and a building originally used as a blacksmith shop.  It is the world's largest open faced granite quarry.  Granite from the quarry was used to build the United States Bullion Depository at Fort Knox, the Arlington Memorial Bridge in Washington, the Wright Brothers National Memorial at Kitty Hawk, and the Albert Einstein Memorial in Washington.
It was added to the National Register of Historic Places in 1980.

References

Quarries in the United States
Industrial buildings and structures on the National Register of Historic Places in North Carolina
Historic districts on the National Register of Historic Places in North Carolina
Buildings and structures in Surry County, North Carolina
National Register of Historic Places in Surry County, North Carolina
Mount Airy, North Carolina